During the 1981–82 English football season, AFC Bournemouth competed in the Football League Fourth Division.

Final league table

Results
Bournemouth's score comes first

Legend

Football League Third Division

FA Cup

League Cup

Football League Group Cup

Squad

References

AFC Bournemouth seasons